Perifosine (also KRX-0401) is a former drug candidate that was under development for a variety of cancer indications. It is an alkyl-phospholipid structurally related to miltefosine. Perifosine interrupts the PI3K/AKT/mTOR pathway by acting as an allosteric AKT inhibitor targeting the pleckstrin homology domain of AKT. It was being developed by Keryx Biopharmaceuticals who had licensed it from Æterna Zentaris Inc.

In 2010, perifosine received orphan drug status in the U.S. for the treatment of multiple myeloma and neuroblastoma, and for multiple myeloma in the EU. However, both were later withdrawn.

In 2011 it was in a phase III trial for colorectal cancer, and another for multiple myeloma.  On April 2, 2012, it was announced that perifosine failed its phase III clinical trial for treatment of colon cancer. Detailed results were released in June 2012. On March 11, 2013 Aeterna Zentaris announced the discontinuing of Phase 3 clinical trial of perifosine for the treatment of relapsed and refractory multiple myeloma.

References

Abandoned drugs
Experimental drugs
Organophosphates
Phospholipids
Protein kinase inhibitors
Quaternary ammonium compounds
Withdrawn drugs
Zwitterions